Kayrat Tuntekov (Qaırat Túntekov) (born February 14, 1986 in Shymkent, Kazakh SSR, Soviet Union) is a Kazakh singer who rose to popularity after winning SuperStar KZ 2, the Kazakh version of Pop Idol, shown by Perviy Kanal Evraziya. Kayrat won in his semi final group with highest votes of 26.1% of the total vote to advance to the finals of SuperStar KZ 2. During the entire series, Kayrat sang in five languages - Kazakh, Russian, English, Spanish, Arabic and French.

Kayrat was famous for being in the same semi final group as first SuperStar KZ - Almas Kishkenbayev in 2003, but did not advance. This is the first Idol series where two or more eventual Idol winners have been in the same semi final group.

SuperStar KZ 2 performances
Auditions: Rock Your Body by Justin TimberlakeTheatre Round: One In A Million by BossonSemi Finals: Top 12: Rock Your Body by Justin TimberlakeTop 11: I Don't Want to Miss a Thing by AerosmithTop 10: Смуглянка from the film В Бой Идут ОдниTop 9: In the Army Now by Status QuoTop 8: Obsésion (No Es Amor) by AventuraTop 7: Бакыт Кушагында by Shamshi KaldayakovTop 6: Tellement 'N' Brick by FaudelTop 5: Voglio D'Anima by Toto CutugnoTop 4: Alive by P.O.D.Top 4: (Go To) California by Rob ZombieTop 3: It's Gonna Be Me by 'N SyncTop 3: Eray by FaudelGrand Final: Позови МеняGrand Final: I Don't Want to Miss a Thing by Aerosmith

Discography
2005: Кайрат Тунтеков

Other recordings
2006: Сенсің Әнім

References

External links
Kayrat Tuntekov - Bio (In Russian)

1986 births
Living people
Idols (franchise) participants
Idols (TV series) winners
21st-century Kazakhstani male singers
SuperStar KZ